Dušan Stanković (born 12 February 1994) is a Serbian professional basketball player for KK Priboj of the First Regional League of Serbia.

References

External links 
 Profile at eurobasket.com
 Profile at fiba.com

1994 births
Living people
Basketball players from Belgrade
Basketball League of Serbia players
KK Mega Basket players
OKK Beograd players
Power forwards (basketball)
Serbian expatriate basketball people in Bosnia and Herzegovina
Serbian expatriate basketball people in North Macedonia
Serbian expatriate basketball people in the Czech Republic
Serbian men's basketball players
Tuři Svitavy players